Felix Burmeister (born 9 March 1990) is a German professional footballer who plays as a centre-back. He is without a club.

Career
In June 2018 Burmeister joined Eintracht Braunschweig.

References

External links

1990 births
Living people
German footballers
Association football defenders
2. Bundesliga players
3. Liga players
Nemzeti Bajnokság I players
Hannover 96 II players
Arminia Bielefeld players
Vasas SC players
Eintracht Braunschweig players
German expatriate footballers
German expatriate sportspeople in Hungary
Expatriate footballers in Hungary
Sportspeople from Würzburg
Footballers from Bavaria